Konesestan (also Romanized as Konesestān and Konosestān; also known as Koneh Sestān, Konestān, and Kulastan) is a village in Eslamabad Rural District, Sangar District, Rasht County, Gilan Province, Iran. At the 2006 census, its population was 861, in 234 families.

References 

Populated places in Rasht County